The War is a seven-part American television documentary miniseries about World War II from the perspective of the United States. The program was directed by American filmmakers Ken Burns and Lynn Novick, written by Geoffrey Ward, and narrated primarily by Keith David. It premiered on September 23, 2007. The world premiere of the series took place at the Palace Theater in Luverne, Minnesota, one of the towns featured in the documentary. It was funded in part by the National Endowment for the Humanities.

Content
The series focuses on World War II in a "bottom up" fashion through the lenses of four "quintessentially American towns":
Luverne, Minnesota
Mobile, Alabama
Sacramento, California
Waterbury, Connecticut

The series recounts the experiences of a number of individuals from these communities as they move through the war in the Pacific, African and European theaters, and focuses on the effect of the war on them, their families and their communities.

A number of notable actors including Adam Arkin, Tom Hanks, Keith David, Samuel L. Jackson, Josh Lucas, Bobby Cannavale and Eli Wallach are heard as voice actors reading contemporary newspaper articles, telegrams, letters from the front, etc. Notable persons including Daniel Inouye, Sidney Phillips, Joe Medicine Crow and Paul Fussell were interviewed.

The full documentary runs 14 hours and was broadcast in seven parts on PBS over two weeks, starting on Sunday, September 23, 2007 and continuing four nights the first week and three nights the second week, from 8 to 10 p.m. (8 to 10:30 p.m. on three nights). The documentary was provided to PBS affiliates in two versions: One with profanity generally prohibited by FCC regulations (including explanations of the acronyms FUBAR and SNAFU) and one without the expletives.

Episodes
Each episode begins with the introduction:

International releases
In some countries, notably Australia, Switzerland, Austria, France and Germany, The War was released as a 14-episode series. The region 4 DVD release of The War splits the series into 14 episodes, but notes that it is "a seven-part documentary".

Critical reception

TIME magazine's James Poniewozik named the series one of the Top 10 New TV Series of 2007, ranking it at no. 9. Barry Garron of The Hollywood Reporter called The War an "artful masterpiece" and "[e]ven more ambitious than any previous Burns documentary, including The Civil War,'" for its wide-ranging illustration of the impact of World War II on the United States and its citizens. John Leonard of New York magazine also commended the miniseries, stating that though the documentary covers areas of the subject that have already been tackled in other World War II documentaries, "it's the nuanced, retrospective witness that makes the series so affecting, the testimonies of survivors who remember both who it is they used to be and the 408,000 fellow Americans who didn't make it." Brian Lowry, writing for Variety, praised the miniseries as "a major victory for PBS", stating that it is "[a] monumental undertaking filled with moments of tremendous poignancy", though he noted that "The most significant quibble here is structural.... just when some stories begin to get interesting, that character is left, only to be returned to hours (and given the broadcast pattern, nights) later."

Robert Koehler, another critic for Variety, found fault in the miniseries focusing mainly on the United States' role in World War II, emphasizing that it was unable to explore the various other conflicts in the war in depth such as the Japanese invasion of East and Southeast Asia and Operation Barbarossa. Alessandra Stanley, writing for the New York Times, gave the series a mixed review, praising it as a "respectful, moving and meticulously illustrated anthology of small-town lives turned upside down by what one elderly veteran calls 'a necessary war,'" while also faulting it for "view[ing] the Second World War as a mostly domestic concern" in which "the London blitz, Stalingrad, Bergen-Belsen and the Warsaw uprising are parentheses." Slate's Beverly Gage echoed these thoughts saying "it's rousing and meaningful and not technically inaccurate, but not exactly the whole truth." Jonathan Storm of The Philadelphia Inquirer wrote, "Once-in-a-lifetime viewing."

Keith David received a Primetime Emmy Award for Outstanding Voice-Over Performance for his narration of the series.

Controversy
The War came under fire after previews during the editing process indicated no mention of the contributions of Hispanics to the war effort, whose representation in the war itself is estimated at up to half a million people; complaints followed later as to omissions of Hispanic and Native American contributions and those of women in uniform. Originally the premiere was scheduled for September 16, 2007; the fact that this date is both Mexican Independence Day and the start of U.S. observance of National Hispanic Heritage Month drew additional fire from its detractors, and the initial airdate was later moved to September 23, 2007, with no comment from PBS.

Although at first the dispute seemed to be settled with the inclusion of additional footage to address the omission, in subsequent weeks, groups began to question conflicting reports from Burns and PBS as to whether the additional footage would be provided as supplementary material or would be integrated into the overall program. Burns initially insisted that re-editing the series was out of the question, with PBS defending that decision on the basis of artistic freedom. Over the months of May and June, as of mid-July, 2007, estimates put out by Burns suggested that additional footage showing interviews with two Hispanics and one Native American would be added to the series, for a total of 28 minutes additional footage to the 14 hours the program was originally planned to cover; the additional footage would air at the conclusion of the selected episodes, but before each episode's final credits.

News outlets began to report as of July 11 that the additional content had not been included in materials made available for preview by television writers and critics, prompting renewed discussion and speculation as to the eventual outcome of the debate.

Notes

External links
Official website
Library of Congress' companion website

2000s American documentary television series
Documentary television series about World War II
Films directed by Ken Burns
Films shot in California
Films shot in Alabama
Films shot in Minnesota
Films shot in Connecticut
PBS original programming